The Twenty-first Amendment of the Constitution Act 2001 (previously bill no. 16 of 2001) is an amendment of the Constitution of Ireland which introduced a constitutional ban on the death penalty and removed all references to capital punishment from the text. It was approved by referendum on 7 June 2001 and signed into law on 27 March 2002. The referendum was held on the same day as referendums on the ratification of the Rome Statute of the International Criminal Court, which was also approved, and on the ratification of the Nice Treaty, which was rejected.

Background

Capital punishment in Ireland had been abolished by the Criminal Justice Act 1990. The purpose of the amendment was therefore not to end the practice, but rather to forbid the Oireachtas from reintroducing the death penalty in future, even during a state of emergency. This is the only explicit exception to the sweeping powers otherwise granted to the state during such an emergency.

The last execution in Ireland occurred in 1954 when the murderer Michael Manning was hanged, the sentence being carried out by Albert Pierrepoint who travelled from Great Britain where he was an official hangman. The penalty has been abolished in law since 1990. It is furthermore a condition of the membership of any country of the European Union that it abolish capital punishment. Ireland is also party to a number of international agreements forbidding the death penalty. These include Protocol No. 13 to the European Convention on Human Rights which forbids capital punishment even during time of war.

Changes to the text
Article 15.5 to be renumbered as 15.5.1º and the insertion of a new subsection to Article 15.5:

Addition of the highlighted text to the first sentence of Article 28.3.3º:

Deletion of the highlighted text from Article 13.6:

Deletion of the following subsection from Article 40.4:

Subsections 6º and 7º of Article 40.4 renumbered as subsections 5º and 6º respectively.

Oireachtas debate
The Twenty-first Amendment was proposed in Dáil Éireann by Minister for Justice, Equality and Law Reform John O'Donoghue on 11 April 2001 on behalf of the Fianna Fáil–Progressive Democrats coalition government led by Taoiseach Bertie Ahern. One member spoke against, Fine Gael TD Brendan McGahon; otherwise, it had the support of all members of the Dáil. It passed final stages without amendment on the same day. It passed all stages in Seanad Éireann on 1 May, and proceeded to a referendum on 7 June 2001.

Campaign
A Referendum Commission was established by Minister for the Environment and Local Government Noel Dempsey. It was chaired by former Chief Justice Thomas Finlay. At the time, its role included setting out the arguments for and against the proposal.

Result
The Twenty-first Amendment was approved on a low turnout (34%), by 62% in favour to 38% against. There were media reports after the referendum on the Twenty-first Amendment that opponents of the death penalty had mistakenly cast a "no" vote, in the belief that they were being asked to vote on capital punishment per se rather than on an amendment that would prohibit it.

See also
Politics of the Republic of Ireland
History of the Republic of Ireland

References

External links
Twenty-first Amendment of the Constitution Act 2001
Full text of the Constitution of Ireland
Criminal Justice Act 1990

2001 in Irish law
2001 in Irish politics
2001 referendums
2002 in Irish law
2002 in Irish politics
21
Anti–death penalty laws
21
June 2001 events in Europe
Amendment, 21